The 2021 Taça de Portugal Final was the last match of the 2020–21 Taça de Portugal, which decided the winner of the 81st edition of the Taça de Portugal, the premier knockout competition in Portuguese football. It was played on 23 May 2021 at the Estádio Cidade de Coimbra in Coimbra, between Braga and Benfica.

It was the 38th final for Benfica in the competition's history after they won the 2017 final and lost the 2020 final, while Braga qualified for their seventh final. The two teams faced each other for the first time in the final of the Portuguese Cup.

The defending champions were Porto, however, they were knocked out in the semi-finals by Braga.

Route to the final

Note: H = home fixture, A = away fixture

Match

Details

Notes

References

2021
2020–21 in Portuguese football
S.L. Benfica matches
S.C. Braga matches
May 2021 sports events in Portugal